The 2005–06 BBL season was the 19th season of the British Basketball League, which ran from 23 September 2005 through to 11 April 2006. The season started earlier than usual because of England's participation in the 2006 Commonwealth Games, which took place during the regular season.

Eleven teams took to the court for the League Championship, which saw each team play each other four times (Twice at home and twice on the road) during the regular season. This was followed by the end of season playoffs which began on 14 April 2006 and ended with Finals weekend on 30 April 2006. One team change in the line-up saw the disappearance of long-time BBL member Thames Valley Tigers who were dissolved by the League after owner John Nike withdrew his financial backing. A consortium of fans bid to save the team resulted in a new franchise being formed, the Guildford Heat who occupied Tigers' place in the Championship.

The season will be best remembered for Newcastle Eagles's incredible "clean sweep" of trophies winning the Championship, BBL Cup, BBL Trophy and finishing it off with an impressive victory in the Play-off final against Scottish Rocks.

Teams

Notable occurrences 
 Guildford Heat made their debut appearance in the BBL on 1 October 2005, losing in overtime 89–88 to Newcastle Eagles at the Metro Radio Arena.
 Newcastle Eagles' Managing Director Paul Blake succeeded Vince Macaulay-Razaq as the new chairman of the BBL prior to the season opening, emphasising that he will strengthen links with England Basketball to lay the foundations for a successful national team.
 Newcastle picked up their first silverware of the season, with an 83–69 win over London Towers in the BBL Cup final at the National Indoor Arena, in Birmingham on 4 December. Eagles' TJ Walker was awarded MVP with 28 points, 12 rebounds and 4 assists.
 Birmingham Bullets owner Craig Bown breached league regulations when, on 26 January, he cancelled Bullets' home game against Milton Keynes Lions in protest of the suspensions of player Yorrick Williams and coach Skouson Harker. Bullets were docked 1 point.
 Former NBA star Dennis Rodman made his debut for Brighton Bears on 28 January, only days after leaving the Celebrity Big Brother house. He scored 4 points in 26 minutes of play against Guildford. Rodman went on to feature in three games for the Bears but later investigation found him to be ineligible and Brighton were docked 1 point by the league.
 The BBL Trophy was also won by Newcastle, who defeated Leicester Riders 71–50 at the SkyDome Arena in Coventry, on 5 February. Newcastle's Andrew Sullivan picked up the MVP with 18 points and 11 rebounds.
 Leicester's Tony Holley broke the record for the most rebounds in a BBL Trophy Final, bagging 19 in all and beating Alan Cunningham's previous best from 1991.
 Many clubs missed several of their top English players, who left for the 2006 Commonwealth Games which took place from 15 to 26 March. Peter Scantlebury MBE's England men's team returned hugely successful having defeated Nigeria 80–57 to bring home the bronze medal. The women's team also won bronze.

BBL Championship (Tier 1)

Final standings 
Each team played each other four times during the regular league season, twice at home and twice on the road. A dominant Newcastle team claimed the League title, with one game to spare against second-placed Scottish Rocks, adding their third piece of silverware for the season.

In their rookie season Guildford Heat finished an impressive fifth, with a 20–20 record, while former heavyweights Brighton Bears and Birmingham Bullets struggled, finishing eighth and last respectively. Both teams were docked one point each, Brighton for fielding an ineligible player against Guildford, while Birmingham owner Craig Bown breached league rules by cancelling the game against Milton Keynes Lions.

+ Brighton Bears were docked 1 point for playing an ineligible player.
++ Birmingham Bullets were docked 1 point due to breach of League Regulations.

The play-offs

Quarter-finals

Semi-finals

Final

National League Division 1 (Tier 2)

Final standings

National League Division 2 (Tier 3)

Final standings

BBL Cup

First round

Quarter-finals

Semi-finals

Final

BBL Trophy

Group stage 

Northern Group

Midlands Group

Southern Group

Semi-finals

Final

Statistics leaders

References 

British Basketball League seasons
1
British